Kent-Erik Andersson (born 24 May 1951) is a former Swedish professional ice hockey right winger who played seven seasons in the National Hockey League for the Minnesota North Stars and New York Rangers.

Playing career
Andersson played seven seasons in the NHL, five with the Minnesota North Stars and two with the New York Rangers. In his native Sweden he played for Färjestads BK, and in his last game with them won the Swedish Championship in 1986. After that season, he was forced to retire due to an eye injury. He also played for the Swedish National team and in 1977 he got a silver medal at the World Championship.

Awards and achievements
1977 silver medalist - World Championships

Records

Career statistics

Regular season and playoffs

International

International play
Team Sweden - 1981 Canada Cup

References

External links
 

1951 births
Living people
Färjestad BK players
Minnesota North Stars players
New York Rangers players
Sportspeople from Örebro
Swedish ice hockey right wingers
Swedish expatriate ice hockey players in the United States
Undrafted National Hockey League players